Belyanka may refer to:

Belyanka, a rural locality in Bashkortostan, Russia
Belyanka, Belgorod Oblast, a rural locality in Belgorod Oblast, Russia
Belyanka (river), a tributary of the Lena, Russian Far East

ru:Белянка